Le Moustoir is a commune in the Côtes-d'Armor department of Brittany in northwestern France.

Population

Inhabitants of Le Moustoir are called moustoiriens in French.

See also
Communes of the Côtes-d'Armor department
Listing of the works of the atelier of the Maître de Tronoën

References

External links

Communes of Côtes-d'Armor